The Hexadyne P60 is an American aircraft engine, designed and produced by Hexatron Engineering of Salt Lake City, Utah for use in ultralight and homebuilt aircraft.

Design and development
The engine is a twin cylinder four-stroke, horizontally-opposed, air-cooled, gasoline engine design, with a mechanical gearbox spur gear reduction drive with a reduction ratio of 2.5:1. It employs electronic ignition and produces  continuous at 5750 rpm. The engine management system is a six-sensor computer and the engine is optimized to drive a  propeller.

The engine was initially displayed at AirVenture, Oshkosh, Wisconsin in 2001.

Applications
Blue Yonder Merlin

Specifications (Hexadyne P60)

See also

References

External links

Air-cooled aircraft piston engines
2000s aircraft piston engines